Elgie is a surname. Notable people with the surname include:
Kim Elgie (born 1933), South African cricketer
Goldwin Elgie (1896–1975), Canadian lawyer and politician
Robert Elgie (1929–2013), Canadian politician
Robert Elgie (academic) (1965–2019), Irish academic

See also
Ellie